Etchebar is a commune in the Pyrénées-Atlantiques department in south-western France.

It is located in the former province of Soule.

Etchebar served as the place of residence of Nicholai Hel, the main character in Trevanian's novel Shibumi.

See also
Communes of the Pyrénées-Atlantiques department

References

Communes of Pyrénées-Atlantiques
Pyrénées-Atlantiques communes articles needing translation from French Wikipedia